The Koryo Hotel is the second largest operating hotel in North Korea, the largest being the Yanggakdo Hotel. The Ryugyong Hotel is larger than both, but is not yet operating. The twin-towered Koryo Hotel building is 143 metres (469 ft) tall and contains 43 stories. Erected in 1985 under Kim Il-sung, it was intended to "showcase the glory and strength of the DPRK."

The hotel is rated five stars by North Korea. A section of the hotel reportedly caught fire on 11 June 2015 due to undisclosed circumstances, leaving the bridge between the two buildings being badly damaged.

Name
"Koryo" is the name of an early kingdom which is the source of the English name "Korea". It is also used in the name of the North Korean airline, Air Koryo.

The Koryo Hotel replaced an older hotel of the same name, but in a different location. For a time after 1946, the leader of North Korea's Democratic Party Cho Man-sik was kept under house arrest in the older Koryo Hotel.

Location

The hotel is situated close to Pyongyang Station in Chung-guyok, central Pyongyang.

Features

The hotel's extravagance is exemplified by its entryway, which consists of a 9-metre (30 ft) wide jade dragon's mouth that leads into an expansive lobby dominated by a mosaic of North Korean cultural symbols. The mosaic tiles make use of a wide variety of precious metals and gemstones underneath low-dispersion glass panes, which are replaced biannually to preserve the mosaic's luster.

The hotel has 500 rooms. Rooms are equipped with a mini-bar and TV. Guests have reported power outages within the hotel grounds.

Amenities include a hard currency gift shop, gym, a swimming pool, a revolving restaurant on the 45th floor, a circular bar on the 44th floor and two cinemas; one with 200 seats and one with 70 seats. There is a coffee shop on the ground floor.  The hotel also features a billiards room on the second floor and a casino in the basement. The casino offers blackjack, roulette, and slot machines. The casino is staffed by Chinese workers.
Amenities do not include the use of the Internet. Plenty of floors in the Hotel appear not to be in use.

Restaurants
Each tower is topped by a revolving restaurant, however only one is open. The revolving restaurant apparently had a 9 pm closing time but in recent years the closing time has been extended or relaxed based on the quality of the guests' tipping. Aside from the single open revolving restaurant, the hotel has four other restaurants including a Japanese restaurant and a Korean BBQ restaurant.

The restaurants are operated by Japanese expatriates and are run as private businesses, but they must pay a fee to the state.

Guest liberty
By some reports, guests are prevented by guards from leaving the hotel. However, others report the ability to wander off the hotel grounds. The hotel is a few blocks from the city's restaurant district and the Pyongyang Railroad Station.

See also
 
List of hotels in North Korea
Tourism in North Korea
Transportation in North Korea

References

External links

Pyongyang Koryo Hotel picture album at Naenara

Hotels in Pyongyang
Twin towers
Skyscrapers in North Korea
Skyscraper hotels
Buildings and structures with revolving restaurants
Hotel buildings completed in 1985
Hotels established in 1985
1985 establishments in North Korea
20th-century architecture in North Korea